Robert Waddell (5 September 1939 – 25 August 2021) was a Scottish footballer who played as a centre forward.

Waddell was part of the Dundee side that won the Scottish league championship in 1962. He also played for Blackpool, Bradford Park Avenue, East Fife and Montrose.

References

Dundee F.C. players
1939 births
2021 deaths
Scottish footballers
Association football forwards
Footballers from Kirkcaldy
Blackpool F.C. players
Bradford (Park Avenue) A.F.C. players
East Fife F.C. players
Montrose F.C. players
Newburgh F.C. players
Scottish Football League players
English Football League players